Barret Swatek (born March 3, 1977) is an American actress and comedian who has appeared in films such as Lethal Weapon 4, The 40-Year-Old Virgin, and High School. She has also made guest appearances on television shows such as Just Shoot Me!, American Dad!, and 2 Broke Girls, and recurred as teacher Ms. Sommers on 10 Things I Hate About You. She played resident bad girl gone good, Cheryl, on the WB series 7th Heaven for three seasons, and played the role of Brittany on the NBC comedy series Quarterlife. Swatek played the character Ally Saxton for 5 seasons on the MTV comedy series Awkward. She currently recurs on American Housewife as Sage and Yellowstone as Victoria Jenkins.

Early life
Swatek was born in Birmingham, Alabama on March 3, 1977 where she pursued competitive figure skating until she was 12 years old. She took part in community theater and studied film in college. She started college at the University of Arizona and finished with a degree in film at Loyola Marymount University.

Career
Swatek's first minor role was on the 1997 television show Power Rangers: Turbo. She continued to have guest starring roles on series Just Shoot Me! before landing a major role as Cheryl on 7th Heaven from 2000 to 2003. She then had a small appearance in The 40-Year-Old Virgin and a recurring role on the television series Quarterlife in 2008. In 2009 and 2010, she appeared on the television series 10 Things I Hate About You as Ms. Sommers and continued that role into the series's second season. She appeared in the 2010 comedy films High School and Barry Munday. In 2011, Swatek was cast on MTV's Awkward as Ally Saxton which ran until 2016. Swatek wrote and starred in two web series, Dating for Dumbasses on Funny or Die and My Two Fans on KoldCast TV. She played Sage on ABC's American Housewife for 5 Seasons. In 2017-2018 she played Victoria Jenkins on TV series Yellowstone.

Filmography

References

External links
 

1977 births
20th-century American actresses
21st-century American actresses
Actresses from Birmingham, Alabama
American film actresses
American television actresses
Living people